Yuli: The Carlos Acosta Story is a 2018 dance biopic about the Cuban ballet director and dancer Carlos Acosta; based on his biography and starring Acosta as the adult version of himself, it was directed by Icíar Bollaín.

Synopsis

Carlos Acosta, an Afro-Cuban boy growing up in Havana, is nicknamed Yuli by his father, who is proud of his heritage — the name is drawn from Santería beliefs. He is a talented dancer and is enrolled in a prestigious ballet school by his parents, who are divorced. The film shows his development from a boy who worries that ballet is "effeminate", to being one of the world's greatest performers and directors, and a pioneer among Black dancers.

Release

The film premiered at San Sebastián International Film Festival on 23 September 2018.

Yuli received very positive reviews, scoring 93% (from 27 reviews) on Rotten Tomatoes. The Guardian gave it three stars out of five, calling Yuli "energetic, emotionally reflective" and praising the dance sequences and Edlison Manuel Olbera Núñez's performance as young Acosta, but criticising some "clunky" dialogue.

Acosta was nominated for the Goya Award for Best New Actor at the 33rd Goya Awards. Eva Valiño, Pelayo Gutiérrez and Alberto Ovejero were nominated for Best Sound, Paul Laverty for Best Adapted Screenplay, Alex Catalán for Best Cinematography and Alberto Iglesias for Best Original Score. Iglesias won a Platino Award at the 6th Platino Awards for best score. At the British Independent Film Awards 2019, Edlison Manuel Olbera Núñez was nominated for a BIFA Award for Best Supporting Actor.

References

External links
Official site (archived version)
 

2018 drama films
2010s sports drama films
Cuban drama films
2010s Spanish-language films
Films set in Cuba
Films about ballet
Biographical films about dancers
Afro-Cuban culture
2010s Spanish films
2010s British films
German drama films
Spanish drama films
British drama films
2010s German films